Deborah Pellow (March 21, 1945) is an American anthropologist. She is a professor emerita at Syracuse University’s Maxwell School of Citizenship and Public Affairs. She is known for her work on urbanization and the anthropology of space and place in West Africa, particularly in Ghana.

Education and training 
She received her bachelor’s degree in anthropology from the University of Pennsylvania in 1967 and a PhD from Northwestern University in 1974, where she completed her dissertation on the topic, "Women in Accra: a study in options."

Academic career 
She is a founding director of the Space and Place Initiative at the Global Affairs Institute at the Maxwell School. She also teaches in the school's Master of Social Science course. Her research is at the intersection of proxemics, ethnicity, micro-politics and conflict, feminist thought, women and gender. From 2009 to 2011, she was served as the president of the Society for Urban National and Transnational Anthropology. She has chaired the University Senate Library Committee and Chancellor Search Committee of Syracuse University. She also lived in northern Nigeria where she studied Hausa.

Selected awards and honors 

 William Wasserstrom Prize for the Teaching of Graduate Students (2019)
 Faculty Advisor of the Year Award (2016)
 Fulbright Senior Research Scholar, Institute of International Education (2005/06)
 Fulbright-Hays Faculty Research Grant - alternate (2005)
 Appleby Mosher Fund, Maxwell School, Syracuse University (2002)
 Appleby Mosher Fund, Maxwell School, Syracuse University (1995)
 Fulbright IIE Teaching Fellowship, Osaka University and Ritsumeikan University, Japan (1991/92)

Selected works 

 A New African Elite: Place in the Making a Bridge Generation, United Kingdom: Berghahn Books (2022)
 Living Afar, Longing for Home:  The Role of Place in the Creation of the Dagomba New Elite
 Landlords and Lodgers: Socio-Spatial Organization in an Accra Zongo. Pbk. Chicago: University of Chicago Press (2008)
 Setting Boundaries: The Anthropology of Spatial and Social Organization, editor and author. Westport CT: Bergin and Garvey (1996)
 Ghana:  Coping with Uncertainty, with Naomi Chazan Boulder: Westview Press (1986)
 Women in Accra:  Options for Autonomy Algonac, MI: Reference Publications, Inc. (1977)

References 

20th-century American anthropologists
American academic administrators
American women anthropologists
Jewish American academics
Living people
Northwestern University alumni
Syracuse University faculty
University of Pennsylvania alumni
American women academics
21st-century American Jews
21st-century American women
1945 births